Orazio Maffei (1580–1609) was a Roman Catholic cardinal.

Biography
On 16 Sep 1607, he was consecrated bishop by Marcello Lante della Rovere, Bishop of Todi, with Metello Bichi, Bishop Emeritus of Sovana, and Girolamo di Porzia, Bishop of Adria, serving as co-consecrators.

References

1580 births
1609 deaths
17th-century Italian cardinals
17th-century Italian Roman Catholic archbishops